The Siscart was a French automobile manufactured from 1908 until 1909.  The company showed three cars - a two-seater 8 hp model, a 12 hp "type course", and a side-entrance 12 hp phaeton - at the 1908 Paris Salon.

References
 David Burgess Wise, The New Illustrated Encyclopedia of Automobiles.

Defunct motor vehicle manufacturers of France